Hammam Melouane is a town and commune in Blida Province, Algeria. According to the 1998 census it has a population of 4,551.

References

Communes of Blida Province
Blida Province